Lah is the surname of the following people:
Alboury Lah (born 1966), football forward from Senegal
Barbara Lah (born 1972), Italian triple jumper
Kyung Lah (born 1971), South Korean-American journalist
Nick Lah (born 1981), Australian rugby union footballer 
Yusri Che Lah (born 1974), Malaysian football midfielder